Ad Turres was the name of several different places in antiquity:

Ad Turres (Bruttium), a town of Bruttium
Ad Turres (Byzacena), a town of Byzacena
Ad Turres (Liburnia), a town of Liburnia; now Crikvenica, Croatia
Ad Turres (Etruria), a town of Etruria
Ad Turres, a town of Illyria; now Tasovčići, near Čapljina, Bosnia and Hercegovina
Ad Turres (Latium), a town of Latium; on the coast near or at San Felice Circeo
Ad Turres Albas, a town of Latium

See also

 Turres, the name in antiquity of Pirot, Serbia, a town between Naissus and Serdica
 Turres, a character in Dragon Ball